The 2004 Harvard Crimson football team represented Harvard University in the 2004 NCAA Division I-AA football season.  Harvard finished the season with an overall record of 10–0, winning the Ivy league championship with a conference mark of 7–0.

Schedule

References

Harvard
Harvard Crimson football seasons
Ivy League football champion seasons
College football undefeated seasons
Harvard Crimson football
Harvard Crimson football